Kaname is a Japanese unisex name, and may refer to the following people:

People
with the given name Kaname
 Kaname Harada (1916–2016), Japanese flying ace 
 Kaname Yokoo (born 1972), a Japanese professional golfer
, Japanese actor
, Japanese speed skater
 Kaname Ikeda (born 1946), a Japanese civil servant
 Kaname Tajima (born 1961), a Japanese politician
 Kaname Takino (born 1996), Japanese baseball player
 Kaname Yuzuki or Shiho Kawaragi (born 1976), a Japanese voice actress
 Wally Kaname Yonamine (born 1925), a former multi-sport American athlete
with the surname Kaname
 Jun Kaname (born 1981), a Japanese actor

Characters
with the given name Kaname
 Kaname Chidori, the female protagonist of Full Metal Panic!
 Kaname Chidori, a character of Koi Kaze
 Kaname Chris, a character in Pretty Rhythm
 Kaname Hagiri, a character of YuYu Hakusho
 Kaname Isaki, a character of Nagi-Asu: A Lull in the Sea
 Kaname Kenjō, a character of Strawberry Panic!
 Kaname Kugatachi, a character of Kenichi: The Mightiest Disciple
 Kaname Kuran, a character in Vampire Knight
 Kaname Kururugi,  one of the two main characters in InuYasha: The Secret of the Cursed Mask
Kaname Moniwa, a character of Haikyu!!
 Kaname Mutō, a character of Rurouni Kenshin's one-shot, Yahiko no Sakabatō
 Kaname Nojima, a character of Shigofumi: Letters from the Departed
 Kaname Ōgi, a character of Code Geass
 Kaname Okiura, a character of Kenkō Zenrakei Suieibu Umishō
 Kaname Sengoku, the protagonist's mentor in Welcome to the Ballroom.
 Kaname Sonō, a character of Gakuen Alice
 Kaname Takishima, a character of Special A
 Kaname Tōjō, a character of Ensemble Stars!! Music
 Kaname Tōsen, a character of Bleach (manga)
 Kaname Date, the protagonist of AI: The Somnium Files
Kaname Asagiri, a character in Magical Girl Site
with the surname Kaname
 Madoka Kaname, a main character from the anime/manga Puella Magi Madoka Magica

Japanese-language surnames
Japanese unisex given names